The Sand Bar Ferry Bridge is a bridge over the Savannah River along the Richmond–Aiken county line on the eastern edge of Augusta, along the Georgia–South Carolina state line. It carries Georgia State Route 28 and South Carolina Highway 28, which are both known as Sand Bar Ferry Road.

History

Dimensions

See also

List of bridges documented by the Historic American Engineering Record in Georgia (U.S. state)
List of bridges documented by the Historic American Engineering Record in South Carolina
Transportation in Augusta, Georgia § Named bridges

References

External links
 of previous bridge

Road bridges in Georgia (U.S. state)
Road bridges in South Carolina
Buildings and structures in Richmond County, Georgia
Buildings and structures in Aiken County, South Carolina
Historic American Engineering Record in Georgia (U.S. state)
Historic American Engineering Record in South Carolina
Transportation in Richmond County, Georgia
Transportation in Aiken County, South Carolina
Transportation in Augusta, Georgia
Buildings and structures in Augusta, Georgia